The Chinese Ambassador to Malaysia is the official representative of the People's Republic of China to Malaysia.

History 
In 1963, Malaysia was founded.
In 1964, the Republic of China (ROC) set up a consulate in Kuala Lumpur.
In 1969, the consulate was upgraded to a Consulate General.
On 31 May 1974, the People's Republic of China and Malaysia took up diplomatic relations.

List of officeholders

Ambassadors of China to Malaysia

See also
 China–Malaysia relations

References 

 
Malaysia
China